Malverde: El Santo Patrón (English: Malverde: The Patron Saint) is an American biographical-drama television series based on the life of the Mexican bandit Jesús Malverde. Produced by Telemundo Global Studios, it aired on Telemundo from 28 September 2021 to 26 January 2022. The series stars Pedro Fernández as the title character.

Plot 
Set in 1910 and inspired by real-life events, the series follows Jesús Malverde, a young man from Sinaloa, Mexico that became a legendary figure and defender of the people. Malverde had a troubled childhood as an orphan where he experienced the trials of war, danger and love as he amassed unexpected power. Over time, he becomes a Robin Hood-like heroic figure, admired by women of all social classes. However, Jesús remains tormented by his unexpected feelings for his childhood love, Isabel. As federal authorities see increasing danger in Malverde's growing power during the early days of the Mexican Revolution, it will take more than love to keep at bay all those who seek to destroy the hero known to the faithful as "The Patron Saint".

Cast

Main 
 Pedro Fernández as Jesús Malverde
 Carolina Miranda as Isabel Aguilar
 Mark Tacher as Vicente del Río
 Alejandro Nones as Nazario Aguilar
 Luis Felipe Tovar as Herminio Quiñones
 Isabella Castillo as La China Navajas
 Ivonne Montero as Ángeles Serrano
 Sofía Castro as Lucrecia Luna
 Miguel de Miguel as Lisandro Luna
 Ramón Medina as Eleuterio Rivas
 Candela Márquez as Azalea Quiñones
 Alan Slim as Matías Galavis
 Mariaca Semprúm as La Güera Navarrete
 Claudio Roca as Secundino Aguilar
 Adrián Makala as John Reed
 María del Carmen Félix as Colonel Amalio Samán
 Humberto Elizondo as Father Hilario
 Salvador Sánchez as Ramón Aguilar
 Lukas Urkijo as Ignacio "Nacho" del Río
 Kenneth Lagunes as Chuyin

Recurring 
 Mabel Cadena
 Héctor Kotsifakis as Lieutenant Gamboa
 Louis David Horne as Zamudio
 Emilio Guerrero as Governor Ramiro del Villar
 Isi Rojano as Tamal
 Antonio Monroi as Surem
 Arturo Beristain
 Juan Carlos Medellin
 Alejandro Navarrete as Pancho Villa

Guest stars 
 Rafael Amaya as Teodoro Valenzuela

Production 
The production was announced in January 2020, with Fernando Colunga being confirmed in the lead role. On 8 February 2021, it was announced that Colunga had dropped out of the role. On 18 February 2021, Pedro Fernández was announced as Colunga's replacement. Filming took place from February 2021 to July 2021.

Episodes

Reception

Ratings 
 
}}

Awards and nominations

Notes

References

External links 
 

2021 telenovelas
2021 American television series debuts
2022 American television series endings
Spanish-language American telenovelas
Spanish-language telenovelas
American telenovelas
Telemundo telenovelas
Telemundo original programming
Works about Mexican drug cartels